Thryptomene remota is a species of flowering plant in the family Myrtaceae and is endemic to the northern part of the Northern Territory. It is an erect shrub with linear to lance-shaped leaves with the narrower end towards the base, and white or cream-coloured flowers with ten stamens.

Description
There are ten stamens and flowering has been observed between November and July.

Taxonomy
Thryptomene remota was first formally described in 1997 by Anthony Bean in the journal Austrobaileya from specimens by Clyde Dunlop collected near Jim Jim Falls in 1981. The specific epithet (remota) means "remote" referring to the species' distance from its relatives in the south-west of Western Australia.

Distribution and habitat
This thryptomene grows in shrubland and woodland, mainly in Kakadu National Park and parts of nearby Arnhem Land.

Conservation status
Thryptomene remota is classified as of "least concern" under the Northern Territory Government Territory Parks and Wildlife Conservation Act 1976.

References

remota
Flora of the Northern Territory
Plants described in 1997
Taxa named by Anthony Bean